USS Aroostook (ID-1256/CM-3/AK-44) was the Eastern Steamship Company's Bunker Hill converted for planting the World War I North Sea Mine Barrage. Bunker Hill was built in 1907 at Philadelphia, Pennsylvania for passenger service between Boston and New York City. They were among the eight ships acquired by the U.S. Navy in November 1917. Bunker Hill and  Massachusetts were converted to minelayers at the Boston Navy Yard. Old Colony was used as a district scout until sent across the Atlantic and turned over to the British in 1919.

Design and Construction
Three new ships for the New England Navigation Company, controlled by the New Haven railroad interests, were designed to compete with the Metropolitan Line vessels  and Harvard using the outside, offshore passage yet be capable of using the inside passage through sounds. The three vessels were designed by the Quintard Iron Works Company of New York with heavy construction for offshore operation and characteristics necessary for inshore operation. The main deck, with the exception of machinery was designed for 1,500 tons of cargo. The second deck had officers quarters and a few passenger staterooms with more officers quarters on the upper deck. Massachusetts and Bunker Hill had reciprocating engines driving twin screws while the later Old Colony, otherwise identical, was designed with Parsons turbines driving triple screws.

Bunker Hill was laid down as hull number 343 by William Cramp & Sons, Philadelphia, Pennsylvania and launched 26 March 1907. The proposed name Commonwealth had been changed to Bunker Hill at the request of Boston's mayor whose daughter christened the ship. The ship was registered with U.S. Official Number 204264, signal KWDT and home port of New London, Connecticut.

Bunker Hill and Massachusetts underwent conversion in 1911 from primarily freight to passenger service. Registered crew size went from 38 to 167.

Service history
On 2 October 1907 the tug  was sunk while assisting Bunker Hill when Bunker Hills propeller slashed her hull, in the New York City area.

World War I for USS Aroostook–1918 
After a brief shakedown cruise in mid-June 1918, Aroostook took on board a load of mines and then began a voyage across the Atlantic Ocean in the company of her sister minelayer, USS Shawmut. This voyage, aided by the novel technique of refueling at sea, took her to Scotland, where in July she participated in laying the North Sea Mine Barrage, laying thousands of mines across the mouth of the North Sea in order to create a barrier for German U-boats trying to depart from German seaports to the open Atlantic.  Aroostook laid a total of 3,180 mines in this operation:
 planted 320 mines during the 3rd minelaying excursion on 14 July,
 planted 320 mines during the 4th minelaying excursion on 29 July,
 planted 290 mines during the 5th minelaying excursion on 8 August,
 planted 330 mines during the 6th minelaying excursion on 18 August,
 planted 310 mines during the 7th minelaying excursion on 26 August,
 planted 290 mines on 30 August to complete the 7th minefield after  was unable to lay its mines,
 planted 320 mines during the 9th minelaying excursion on 20 September,
 planted 330 mines during the 10th minelaying excursion on 27 September,
 planted 330 mines during the 11th minelaying excursion on 4 October, and
 planted 340 mines during the final 13th minelaying excursion on 24 October.
This effort, nearly completed, was the major operation of the U.S. Navy in European waters during World War I, and it came to an end on 11 November 1918 with the Armistice with Germany and the end of fighting in World War I. USS Aroostook steamed home to the East Coast in December 1918

An aircraft tender, 1919–1931
During the spring of 1919, USS Aroostook was refitted as an "aircraft tender" to support the attempt by U.S. Navy naval aviators to make the first transatlantic crossing of the Atlantic Ocean by air.  The Navy had four huge Curtiss NC floatplanes built for the project.  These aircraft were twice the size of contemporary aircraft.  The route for this attempt used southeastern Newfoundland and the Portuguese Azores Islands as stopping-off points for refueling and maintenance work on the new planes, and for rest and mess periods for their aviators. In the event of the attempt, mechanical problems and lack of replacement parts necessitated the cannibalization of one of the aircraft, leaving three "Nancys" for the attempt.

During the first half of May 1919, Aroostook was waiting at the port of Trepassey, Newfoundland, to serve as a floating base for the three medium-sized Curtiss NC floatplanes that took off from the New York City area on 16 May. After taking care of the Curtiss NCs and their crews, and seeing them off towards the Azores, Aroostook next steamed to England, where she rendezvoused with the NC-4, the only airplane to complete the transatlantic flight, at the end of May. The crewmen of Aroostook then disassembled the NC-4 and loaded her onto the ship for the voyage back to United States.

In August and early September, Aroostook carried a cargo of naval mines and supplies to California via the Panama Canal. She spent the rest of the year on the West Coast carrying out transportation missions and also as the aviation flagship for the Pacific Fleet.

Though she continued to be classified as a "minelayer", and she received the warship designation CM-3 (minelayer) in mid-1920, Aroostooks remaining active service was as an aircraft tender. Throughout the 1920s, she mainly served on the Eastern Pacific Ocean, but she made occasional voyages to the Caribbean Sea and the Atlantic Seaboard to take part in the annual, massive "fleet problem" exercises.

Aroostook also steamed to Hawaii and back in 1925 and 1928, including on the first occasion as the support aircraft tender for a pioneering attempt to fly two patrol planes from the West Coast to Hawaii.

Decommissioning and sale, 1931–1947
Taken out of commission in March 1931 at the Puget Sound Navy Yard, Bremerton, Washington, Aroostook was laid up in reserve for the next decade. With World War II raging in Europe, and the war threatening to spread worldwide soon, she was considered for reactivation as a cargo ship, and in May 1941, she was re-designated AK-44. However, her age and her limited capabilities kept her inactive. In February 1943, Aroostook was stricken from the Naval Vessel Register and then transferred to the War Shipping Administration. Regaining the name Bunker Hill, she stayed in port for the rest of the war. Although she was sold in 1947 to a firm headed by Anthony Cornero that planned to use her as a floating casino off of Malibu. The old ship was seized by the U.S. Coast Guard as a "gambling ship" on 17 September 1946. The ship was turned over to the U.S. Maritime Commission on 24 July 1947. On 17 October 1947 the ship was sold to Basalt Rock Co., Inc. for $18,000 for scrapping.

Footnotes

References

External links
USS Aroostook : Naval Historical Center

Ships built in Philadelphia
1907 ships
Unique minelayers of the United States Navy
World War I mine warfare vessels of the United States
World War II auxiliary ships of the United States
Cargo ships of the United States Navy